Pilodeudorix zela, the blue-edged playboy, is a butterfly in the family Lycaenidae. It is found in Senegal (Basse Casamance), Guinea-Bissau, Guinea, Sierra Leone, Liberia, Ivory Coast, Ghana, Nigeria (south and the Cross River loop), Cameroon, the Republic of the Congo, the Central African Republic, the Democratic Republic of the Congo (Kinshasa, Lualaba and Tanganyika), Uganda, north-western Tanzania and northern Zambia. The habitat consists of forests, including dry forests.

References

External links
Die Gross-Schmetterlinge der Erde 13: Die Afrikanischen Tagfalter. Plate XIII 66 b

Butterflies described in 1869
Deudorigini
Butterflies of Africa
Taxa named by William Chapman Hewitson